Yusuf Elgörmüş (born September 14, 1968) is a Turkish doctor and businessman. 
He founded and is chairman of the Medicine Hospital Group and Atlas University.

References 

1968 births
Living people
21st-century Turkish businesspeople
Turkish pediatricians
Istanbul University Cerrahpaşa Faculty of Medicine alumni